The Adams-Magoun House is a historic house at 438 Broadway in Somerville, Massachusetts.  Built about 1783, it is one of the city's few surviving 18th-century buildings and its best-preserved. It was listed on the National Register of Historic Places in 1989.

Description and history
The Adams-Magoun House stands on Winter Hill in central Somerville, roughly midway between Magoun Square and the Winter Hill commercial district.  It is set facing east on the south side of Broadway, between Bartlett Street and Glenwood Road.  It is a 2½-story wood-frame structure, with a gabled roof, two interior chimneys, and a clapboarded exterior.  The main facade is five bays wide, with its entrance at the center, framed by pilasters and topped by a half-round transom window and gabled pediment.  The interior follows a typical center hall plan, and has retained a number of original features, including particularly ornate turned balusters on the main staircase.

It is one of a handful of 18th-century houses in Somerville, and its main entry transom window is believed to be one of the oldest of its type in the Boston area. Adams was married to Sarah Tufts, whose extended family owned large tracts of land in the town, including the tracts which eventually became Tufts University. She was the daughter of  Peter and Anne Tufts. Their daughter, Sarah Ann Adams, married John C. Magoun (1797–1882), for whom Magoun Square is named. Magoun was a local assessor, served on the school committee as an overseer of the poor, and was a captain in the militia. At the time of Adams' marriage to Magoun, the farm extended from Broadway to the Boston and Maine Railroad, between Central and Lowell streets.

See also
National Register of Historic Places listings in Somerville, Massachusetts

References

External links

Houses completed in 1783
Houses on the National Register of Historic Places in Somerville, Massachusetts
Georgian architecture in Massachusetts